The Robert Penn Warren House, also known as Twin Oaks, is a historic house in Prairieville, Louisiana, U.S.. It was designed in the Colonial Revival architectural style, and it was built in c. 1905.

It was the private residence of author Robert Penn Warren from 1941, when he bought the house, to 1942. During this period, the house received several alterations from its original plan.

The house has been listed on the National Register of Historic Places on January 7, 1993.

References

See also
National Register of Historic Places listings in Ascension Parish, Louisiana

Houses on the National Register of Historic Places in Louisiana
Colonial Revival architecture in Louisiana
Houses completed in 1941
Houses in Ascension Parish, Louisiana